McGhee Tyson Air National Guard Base  is a joint military facility located at McGhee Tyson Airport. It is located approximately 10 miles (16 km) south of the central business district of Knoxville, near Alcoa, in Blount County, Tennessee, United States. It was the site of McGhee Tyson Air Force Base from 1952 until 1960.

Overview
McGhee Tyson ANGB is the home of the 134th Air Refueling Wing (134 ARW) of the Tennessee Air National Guard, an Air Mobility Command (AMC) gained unit which functions as the host wing for the installation. Other tenants of the base include the 119th Command and Control Squadron the I.G. Brown Air National Guard Training and Education Center, Air National Guard Band of the South, and the 1st Squadron, 230th Armored Cavalry Regiment's Army Aviation Support Facility of the Tennessee Army National Guard, operating several OH-58 Kiowa Warrior helicopters.

History
The announcement that the United States Air Force would build an air base at McGhee-Tyson Airport was made on January 26, 1951. Fighter-interceptors based there would defend the Atomic Energy Commission facilities at nearby Oak Ridge National Laboratory, the Alcoa aluminum plant and the rest of the Tennessee Valley, including the vital Tennessee Valley Authority dams. Initial construction was estimated at $5.5 million.  The military facilities built on the northwest side of the airfield have remained separate from the civilian airport.

The base officially opened on August 9, 1952 as McGhee Tyson Air Force Base, but air defense alert operations began there much sooner.  The federalized Tennessee Air National Guard Detachment 1, 105th Fighter Interceptor Squadron was assigned to the base while on active duty during the Korean War. Assigned to Air Defense Command (ADC) and flying F-47D Thunderbolts, the 105th FIS was headquartered at Berry Field in Nashville.  The 105th FIS remained at the base until 1 January 1952 when it was returned to state control under the Tennessee Air National Guard

The Air Defense Command's active duty Central Air Defense Force, 516th Air Defense Group (516 ADG), replaced the Air National Guard unit on 1 January 1952.  With it were the 516th Air Base Squadron, 516th Materiel Squadron, and the 516th Infirmary. Between 1200 and 1400 airmen, with a then-$1.5 million annual payroll, were assigned to the base.

The tactical unit of the 516 ADG was the 469th Fighter-Interceptor Squadron (469 FIS), which initially inherited the World War II-vintage F-47s (formerly P-47 Thunderbolts) of the Air National Guard, later replacing them with F-86D Sabre jet fighters. In 1953, the 460th Fighter-Interceptor Squadron became a second F-86D squadron at the base.  The 460th was reassigned to Portland Airport, Oregon in 1955, while the 469th remained at TYS until 1957 when it was inactivated.

The 516th Air Defense Group was redesignated as the 355th Fighter Group (Air Defense) on 18 August 1955.  The 354 FIS was activated with F-86Ds to become the second FIS. 

On August 29, 1957 the Air Force announced that the base, by then worth $7.75 million in then-current dollars, would close. About 4,000 active duty Air Force personnel left the area, taking with them $25.5 million in equipment from the base. Regular Air Force operations at McGhee Tyson Airport ended on January 8, 1958 and the 354 FIS was inactivated on that date.  The 355 FIS remained until 1 July 1960 when it was inactivated along with the F-86 interceptor squadrons, and the base turned over to Tennessee Air National Guard control.

The 134 ARW, which is operationally gained by the Air Mobility Command (AMC), operates KC-135R Stratotankers for both air mobility and aerial refueling of military aircraft.  

McGhee Tyson ANGB is also home to the I.G. Brown Air National Guard Training and Education Center and its associated Academy of Military Science (AMS).  Similar to U.S. Air Force (USAF) Officer Training School (OTS), AMS was an alternate commissioning source for prospective USAF officers, primarily former enlisted airmen of the Air Force Reserve and Air National Guard directly inputted into various units of the Air Force Reserve Command and the Air National Guard throughout the United States.  The AMS program was merged into the Officer Training School (OTS) organization at Maxwell AFB, Alabama in 2010.

See also

 Aerospace Defense Command Fighter Squadrons

References

 Maurer, Maurer. Air Force Combat Units Of World War II. Washington, DC: U.S. Government Printing Office 1961 (republished 1983, Office of Air Force History).
 
  A Handbook of Aerospace Defense Organization 1946 - 1980,  by Lloyd H. Cornett and Mildred W. Johnson, Office of History, Aerospace Defense Center, Peterson Air Force Base, Colorado
 Winkler, David F. (1997), Searching the skies: the legacy of the United States Cold War defense radar program. Prepared for United States Air Force Headquarters Air Combat Command.

Airports in Tennessee
Knoxville, Tennessee
Buildings and structures in Blount County, Tennessee
Installations of the United States Air National Guard
Installations of the United States Air Force in Tennessee
Airports established in 1952